Snowtime!, also released as La Bataille géante de boules de neige in France and Cleo in the United Kingdom, is a 2015 Canadian computer-animated comedy-drama film from Quebec. Directed by Jean-François Pouliot, it is an animated remake of the 1984 film The Dog Who Stopped the War (La Guerre des tuques).

The film inspired the spinoff television series Snowsnaps (Les Mini-Tuques) that premiered in September 2018. A sequel film, Racetime (La Course des tuques), was released in December 2018.

Plot
In a small village, a group of children get the idea to plan and stage a giant snowball fight during winter break over a snow fort, with the group who controls the fort by the end of the break winning. One boy, Luke, is decided to lead one team, but the group cannot decide who will be the opposing team. The group attempt to provoke two other kids, Piers and Frankie, into being the opposing team by pelting them with snowballs, but accidentally pelt Sophie, the new girl, whom Luke has a crush on. Infuriated, Sophie accepts leadership of the opposing team and has Frankie construct an elaborate snow fort.

On the first day of battle, Luke's team is successfully repelled. The following day, one boy, Chuck, constructs snowballs coated with ice, but the team decides not to use them. However, Sophie's younger sister Lucy discovers the iceballs and informs Sophie, spurring her to stage an ambush using  snowballs filled with paint. During the attack, Sophie's team manages to steal Luke's bugle, an instrument he kept in memory of his father, who died during a war. Sophie's team gets into an argument with her, resulting in her not showing up the following day, allowing Luke's team to successfully infiltrate the fort and drive off its defenders. Learning of this, Sophie sneaks into the fort at night and takes their flag, despite being ambushed by Luke's group.

To get the feuding groups to reconcile, Nicky and his cousin Daniel feign injury to get the groups to unite. The two groups decide to abandon the war, but Sophie convinces Luke to return the fort to her side for one last battle, as she'd been absent when they first took it. Luke's group recruits the first graders to assist in the assault and utilizes Frankie's stolen plans to bombard the snow fort with giant ice blocks. In the battle that ensues, the fort collapses, crushing Piers' dog Cleo, killing her. A grief-stricken Piers blames Luke for taking the game too far. A remorseful Luke sounds a bugle call as the kids bury Cleo. The two teams, realizing they had let the game divide them, reconcile and tear down the remains of the fort together.

Production
Having earned $3,359,425 in 2015, the film was the highest-grossing Canadian film at the domestic box office during the calendar year, thus winning the Cineplex Golden Screen Award conferred by the Academy of Canadian Cinema & Television.  It had its American premiere at the 2016 Sundance Film Festival. The film was released in English Canada on February 12, 2016 and the United States on February 19, 2016.

The soundtrack features many songs by various artists, including two recordings of "L'hymne" by Celine Dion, one English rendition as a solo artist and one French rendition recorded as a duet with Fred Pellerin.

Characters

Reception

The film has grossed over $13 million worldwide, including  in China.

Reviews

On review aggregator website Rotten Tomatoes, the film holds an approval rating of 71% based on 24 reviews, with an average rating of 6.2/10. On Metacritic, which assigns a normalized rating to reviews, the film has a weighted average score 52 out of 100, based on 11 critics, indicating "mixed or average reviews".

References

External links
 Official website
 

2015 animated films
2015 films
2015 computer-animated films
Canadian animated feature films
Canadian children's animated films
Films directed by Jean-François Pouliot
Remakes of Canadian films
Canadian Christmas films
English-language Canadian films
French-language Canadian films
2010s English-language films
2010s Canadian films
Animated films about children